Heart-Shaped Box (2007) is the debut horror novel of author Joe Hill. The book was published on February 13, 2007 by William Morrow.

The titles of the novel and its four sections are all those of rock songs: "Heart-Shaped Box" by Nirvana, "Black Dog" by Led Zeppelin, "Ride On" by AC/DC, "Hurt" by Nine Inch Nails, and "Alive" by Pearl Jam.

Synopsis
Aging rock star Judas Coyne spends his retirement collecting morbid memorabilia, including a witch's confession, a real snuff film and, after being sent an email directly about the item online, a dead man's funeral suit. Jude is informed by Jessica Price, the dead man's daughter, that the old man's spirit is attached to the suit, such that Jude is effectively buying himself a ghost. Jude cannot pass up this creepy opportunity.

The suit arrives in a heart-shaped box. Various odd occurrences cause Jude to realize that the ghost is deadly and is out to kill him and those around him. His assistant, Danny Wooten, kills himself, but not before contacting the woman who sent the suit. Jude finds out that the ghost was the stepfather of a groupie, Florida, whom Jude lived with for a few months and who had later committed suicide. The ghost holds Jude responsible for Florida's death and wants revenge. Jude flees his house with his current girlfriend, Georgia, with the ghost in hot pursuit.

The ghost's intent is to separate Jude from his two dogs, Angus and Bon, who, as familiars, can protect their owners from the dead. Jude and Georgia take the dogs with them while fleeing south. The dogs save them several times, but the ghost eventually kills them. Jude and Georgia discover that Florida had been hypnotised and molested by her stepfather, Craddock McDermott. When Florida threatened to turn in Craddock and her elder sister Jessica to the police, they killed her and staged her death as a suicide. Later, a dying Craddock hexed the suit and arranged for Jessica to sell it to Jude.

After a series of gory battles between Jude and Craddock, Georgia finds a way to contact Florida beyond the grave for help fighting her stepfather's ghost. In the end, Craddock is vanquished, freeing Jude and Georgia from his curse, and Jessica is sent to jail. After surviving the horrendous ordeal, Jude and Georgia eventually marry.

Publication
Hill received a great deal of attention with the publication of Heart-Shaped Box. Subterranean Press published the advance edition of 500 copies and they sold out within days, long before publication. The limited signed and numbered 200 copies and 15 lettered copies are sought after by Joe Hill book collectors.  A second printing of the limited edition was announced by Subterranean Press on April 14, 2007, and released in May 2007. The second printing sold out within hours of being announced. Hill went on an international tour promoting his book which ended in April 2007.

His previous book, 20th Century Ghosts, was only available through the UK publisher PS Publishing and was printed in very limited quantities (1,700 copies in total, 700 of which are signed).

Heart-Shaped Box peaked on The New York Times bestseller list at #8, and has been reviewed by the New York Times and Time magazine.

Heart-Shaped Box won the 2007 Bram Stoker Award for Best First Novel.

Adaptations 
The film rights to Heart-Shaped Box were acquired by Warner Bros. in 2007 to be produced by Akiva Goldsman. Irish director Neil Jordan wrote the script and was slated to direct. The project stalled in development hell.

References

External links 
 Joe Hill's personal website
 Read a Heart-Shaped Box excerpt online
 Time Magazine review of Heart-Shaped Box

2007 American novels
Debut speculative fiction novels
American horror novels
Novels by Joe Hill (writer)
Ghost novels
2007 debut novels
Bram Stoker Award for Best First Novel winners
William Morrow and Company books